The 2019 Braga Open was a professional tennis tournament played on clay courts. It was the second edition of the tournament which was part of the 2019 ATP Challenger Tour. It took place in Braga, Portugal between 6 and 12 May 2019.

Singles main-draw entrants

Seeds

 1 Rankings are as of 29 April 2019.

Other entrants
The following players received wildcards into the singles main draw:
  Francisco Cabral
  Tiago Cação
  Luís Faria
  Fred Gil
  Tseng Chun-hsin

The following players received entry into the singles main draw as alternates:
  Luis David Martínez
  Jaroslav Pospíšil

The following players received entry into the singles main draw using their ITF World Tennis Ranking:
  Vít Kopřiva
  Orlando Luz
  João Menezes
  David Pérez Sanz
  Oriol Roca Batalla

The following players received entry from the qualifying draw:
  Daniel Batista
  Sem Verbeek

The following player received entry as a lucky loser:
  Gonçalo Falcão

Champions

Singles
 
 João Domingues def.  Facundo Bagnis 6–7(5–7), 6–2, 6–3.

Doubles

 Gerard Granollers /  Fabrício Neis def.  Kimmer Coppejans /  Zdeněk Kolář 6–4, 6–3.

References

2019 ATP Challenger Tour
2019 in Portuguese tennis
May 2019 sports events in Portugal